Grulla may refer to:

Grulla Morioka, a Japanese football (soccer) club
Grulla National Wildlife Refuge, wildlife refuge in New Mexico
Grulla, Texas, small town in southern Texas 
Grullo, a color of horses in the dun family
Grullos, one of eleven parishes in Candamo, Spain